The Place de la Nation (formerly Place du Trône, subsequently Place du Trône-Renversé during the Revolution) is a circle on the eastern side of Paris, between Place de la Bastille and the Bois de Vincennes, on the border of the 11th and 12th arrondissements.

Widely known for having the most active guillotines during the French Revolution, the square was renamed Place de la Nation on Bastille Day, 14 July 1880, under the Third Republic.

The square includes a large bronze sculpture by Aimé-Jules Dalou, the Triumph of the Republic depicting Marianne, and is encircled by shops and a flower garden. It is served by the Paris Metro station Nation.

History

The  and Louis XIV's aborted triumphal arch

The project of a massive, four-pillared triumphal arch on the Place du Trône would mark the culmination of this program. A design by Claude Perrault was selected, and the arch's foundations and lower structures were erected in high-quality stone in the 1670s, but the project was abandoned around 1680, possibly for lack of funds. the unfinished structures were demolished in 1716, just after the death of Louis XIV.

The triumphal arch project holds a special place in France's cultural history, as it was the starting point of a public controversy known as the Quarrel of Inscriptions, itself a significant episode of the broader Quarrel of the Ancients and the Moderns that reached its climax a decade later with the production by Charles Perrault, Claude's brother, of his essay on the era of Louis XIV. The initial question was whether the inscriptions glorifying Louis on the projected arch should be in ("ancient") Latin or ("modern") French. Antiquarian François Charpentier argued in favor of French inscriptions, and was countered by Jesuit Jean Lucas of the College de Clermont, who defended the option of Latin in an eloquent address pronounced at the College on  that was published in 1677 under the title .

Mur des Fermiers Généraux

The Mur des Fermiers généraux was an enclosure built between 1784 and 1791, one of the several city walls built between the early Middle Ages and the mid 19th century well beyond the buildings of Paris in a campaign to encircle houses, gardens and monasteries for the purpose of controlling the flow of goods and to enable their taxation by the Ferme générale.

The wall's construction left a vast grassy space of vines and market gardens as far as the medieval city wall and the walls of the gardens of the old village of Picpus, which contained large convents, schools and retreats.  Originally, the square accommodated two pavilions and two columns of the barrière du Trône designed by Claude Nicolas Ledoux and built for the barrier of octroi (for tax collection) which surrounded the entrance to the cours de Vincennes.  The columns were surmounted by statues of Kings Philip II and Louis IX.

French Revolution
During the Revolution, the square was renamed Place du Trône-Renversé - Square of the Toppled Throne - on 10 August 1792.  A guillotine was set up in the southern half of the square, near the Pavilion of Law built by Ledoux. Those guillotined there were buried in the nearby Picpus Cemetery and include:
 André Chénier, 25 July 1794.
 Cécile Renault, Henri Admirat and Jean-Baptiste Michonis, 17 June 1794.
 Josse-François-Joseph Benaut, composer, 13 July 1794.
 The Martyrs of Compiègne, Carmelite nuns, 17 July 1794

19th century

The central monument, The Triumph of the Republic, is a bronze sculpture created by Aimé-Jules Dalou. It was erected to mark the centenary of the Revolution, at first in plaster in 1889 and then in bronze in 1899.  The figure of Marianne, personifying the Republic, stands on a globe in a chariot pulled by lions and surrounded by various symbolic figures, and looks towards the Place de la Bastille. When the monument was erected, it was surrounded by a large pond. Additional sculptures of alligators, symbols for the threats to democracy, were removed during the Nazi occupation of Paris and melted down.

20th century
On 22 June 1963, the magazine Salut les copains organised a concert at Place de la Nation, featuring singers such as Johnny Hallyday, Richard Anthony, Eddy Mitchell and Frank Alamo. It attracted over 150,000 young people. The headline of the following day's issue of the journal Paris-Presse read, "Salut les voyous !".  The photographer Jean-Marie Périer, who was a friend of many of the performers, photographed the concert. The Place de la Nation was the location of the Foire du Trône before the Pelouse de Reuilly.

Notes

External links
  Recherche des rues de Paris

Buildings and structures in the 11th arrondissement of Paris
Buildings and structures in the 12th arrondissement of Paris
Nation